Nicholas Tatonetti is an American bioscientist who is Professor of Biomedical Informatics and Chief Officer of Cancer Data Science at the Herbert Irving Comprehensive Cancer Center, Columbia University. His lab develops data mining approaches to understand clinical and molecular data.

Early life and education 
Tatonetti was an undergraduate at Arizona State University. He majored in computational mathematics and biotechnology. In 2008, he completed a bachelor's degree, and moved to Stanford University as a graduate researcher, where he worked with Russ Altman in biomedical informatics. During his PhD, he developed novel statistical methods for observational data mining.

Research and career 
In 2012, Tatonetti started his career as the Herbert Irving Assistant Professor in Biomedical Informatics at Columbia University. He was made Director of the Clinical Informatics Division in 2013, and Chief Officer for Cancer Data Science in 2022.

Tatonetti uses data science to inform drug design and to evaluate the effectiveness of potential pharmaceutical candidates for specific people. He combines electronic health records and genomics databases with artificial intelligence and machine learning.

Personal life 
Tatonetti has described himself as pansexual and gender non-conforming.

Selected publications

References 

Living people
Arizona State University alumni
Stanford University alumni
Columbia University faculty
American scientists
Year of birth missing (living people)